The 1977 Australian Drivers' Championship was an Australian motor racing competition for racing cars complying with Australian Formula 1 or with Australian Formula 2. It was the 21st Australian Drivers' Championship to be awarded by the Confederation of Australian Motor Sport.

The championship winner, John McCormack, was awarded the 1977 CAMS Gold Star.

Calendar

The championship was contested over a four-round series.

Points system
Championship points were awarded on a 9-6-4-3-2-1 basis to the first six place-getters at each round.

Where a round was contested over two heats, points were allocated on a 20-16-13-11-10-9-8-7-6-5-4-3-2-1 basis to the first 14 place-getters in each heat.
The six drivers attaining the highest aggregate from both heats were then awarded the championship points for that round.
Where more than one driver attained the same total, the relevant placing was awarded to the driver who was higher placed in the last heat.

Championship standings

Championship name
Sources vary as to the actual name of the championship. 
 The 1977 CAMS Manual of Motor Sport refers to the Australian Formula 1 Championship - Gold Star Award, stating that "The phrase "Australian Champion Driver" shall be reserved exclusively for the winner of the CAMS Gold Star". 
 Australian Competition Yearbook, 1978 Edition uses the term Australian Drivers' Championship.
 Historical records published by CAMS use the term Australian Drivers' Championship.

References

Australian Drivers' Championship
Drivers' Championship